St. Joseph Secondary School, colloquially known as St. Joe's is a Catholic high school located in the Streetsville community of Mississauga, Ontario. The school is administered by the Dufferin-Peel Catholic District School Board. St. Joseph Secondary School is one of few schools in the province of Ontario to offer Pre-Advanced Placement courses starting in grade 9 while most schools offer the option of Advanced Placement (AP) level classes in grade 12. Students who graduate in any course with an AP level exam completed will earn university level credits in said course. The school is also a provider of the Business and Transportation Specialist High Skills Majors (SHSM), granting students who complete the major with a Ontario Secondary School Diploma including a recognized seal for employment opportunities after graduation.

Like other members of the district, students who attend St. Joseph C.S.S. receive teaching on religion, family life and prayer in addition to the standard curriculum found in public schools. The school is linked with the St. Joseph's Parish in Streetsville, which is a part of the Roman Catholic Archdiocese of Toronto. Its scriptural motto is "Be Not Afraid... Come Follow Me".

Some extra-curricular programs include: Model United Nation (MUN), Future Business Leaders Association (FBLA), The Mirror (school newspaper), Culture Shock, Green Team, L.I.F.E. Ministry, SafeSpace, Yearbook Committee, Annual Christmas talent Show, Artsapalooza, Artsfest, School Musical, Peer Tutoring, Jazz and Marching Band and the Nicaragua Project. Also, the school LINK Crew Ambassadors are a successful widespread organization, and assist with tours and parent evenings. The school is built almost exactly like Philip Pocock Catholic Secondary School also in Mississauga. The school was attended by Trooper Marc Diab, who was killed by a roadside bomb while serving his country in the War in Afghanistan. The park behind the school was renamed Trooper Marc Diab Memorial Park, in his honour.

In June 2013, St. Joe's was awarded the 2012–13 Premier's Award for Accepting Schools on behalf of Ontario Premier Kathleen Wynne. The Premier's Awards for Accepting Schools are awarded annually and recognize schools that have demonstrated initiative, creativity and leadership in promoting a safe, inclusive and accepting school climate. Bob Delaney, MPP (Mississauga-Streetsville) made a presentation in the St. Joseph Secondary School library on Monday, June 17, 2013.

Feeder schools
 Our lady of good voyage
 St. Bernadette
 St. David of Wales
 St. Raymond
 St. Herbert
 St. Valentine (residents west of Mavis rd)

Athletics
The St. Joseph Jaguars have many sports teams which are known locally as some of the most competitive in the school board. Teams include:
 Swimming (junior & senior)
 Hockey (senior & junior boys and varsity girls)
 Cross-country Running (senior, junior & midget)
 Golf (varsity)
 Field Hockey (varsity girls)
 Basketball (senior & junior)
 Volleyball (senior, junior & boys bantam)
 Cricket (varsity)
 Soccer (senior & junior)
 Track & Field (senior, junior & midget)
 Baseball (boys varsity)
 Fast Pitch Softball (girls varsity)
 Tennis (senior & junior)
 Curling (varsity mixed)
 Badminton (senior & junior)
 Table Tennis (junior & senior)
 Flag Football (girls)

Championships
 Bantam Boys Volleyball 2005 Champions 
 Junior Boys Soccer Tier 1 2007 Champions 
 Senior Rugby Boys Tier 2 2013 Champions
 Bantam Boys Basketball 2010 Champions
 Senior Boys Basketball 2016 Champions

Incidents

Stabbings

On June 17, 2009, at least two students and one teacher were stabbed after they attempted to stop a fight between several students on school property. Two students suffered severe stab wounds and were rushed to Credit Valley Hospital. Peel Regional Police said they received the initial call at around 8:30 a.m. After reports of multiple stabbings, the school was placed in lock down between 8:30 a.m. and 10:00 a.m. Shortly after the lock down was lifted, the school was evacuated and remained closed for the rest of the day while police continued their investigation into the stabbings. Later in the day, Peel Regional Police announced that two suspects aged 16 and 17 were arrested and charged with attempted murder.

Notable alumni
 Owen Power, first pick of the 2021 NHL draft on the Buffalo Sabres
Tiffany Cameron, professional soccer player who played on the Canada women's national soccer team 
 Andre Durie, professional Canadian football player 
 Chris Leroux, professional baseball player

See also
 List of high schools in Ontario

References

External links 
 St. Joseph Secondary School Website
 Dufferin Peel Catholic District School Board

High schools in Mississauga
Catholic secondary schools in Ontario
Educational institutions established in 1994
1994 establishments in Ontario